Isabela, officially the Municipality of Isabela,  is a 2nd class municipality in the province of Negros Occidental, Philippines. According to the 2020 census, it has a population of 64,516 people.

Isabela is known for BISCOM (Binalbagan Isabela Sugar Company) located in nearby Binalbagan town.

In 1951, the barrios of Magallon, Odiong and Guinpanaan were separated from Isabela and formed into the town of Magallon (now Moises Padilla).

Geography

Barangays
Isabela is politically subdivided into 30 barangays ("Pob." means poblacion).

Climate

Demographics

Economy

Festival

"Tigkalagkalag" is celebrated on the evening of Nov. 2 every year in the town of Isabela. The Pana-ad victory of Tigkalagkalag (Kalag-Kalag) festival is expected to boost the attraction of this unique festival that began in Purok Manacup beside the public cemetery in Isabela town where people would have fun during the night of All Souls Day that was capped with a beauty pageant called Search for the White Lady, this is the same of San Juan Balete Drive {Lost Soul}. It spun off into the municipal festival under former Mayor Renato Malabor, when the town was searching for a festival that was going to be its tourism plank.

Tigkalalag festival of Isabela turned what otherwise are morbid concepts of coffins, candelabras and crashing tombs into a whimsical, tightly designed, skillfully-choreographed presentation that sent it howling to success in yearly competition of all the festivals of Negros Occidental. Tigkalalag is Hiligaynon for All Souls' Day.

Notable personalities

Allan K., actor-comedian/TV host/entrepreneur

References

External links
 [ Philippine Standard Geographic Code]
Isabela Profile at the Official Website of Negros Occidental
Philippine Census Information
Municipality of Isabela
Local Governance Performance Management System 

Municipalities of Negros Occidental